The Gordon Way is a waymarked hiking trail in Aberdeenshire, Scotland. It runs for  through the Bennachie Forest. The route was one of a  series maintained by the Forestry Commission and Aberdeenshire Council. In 2016, the council withdrew completely from its maintaining the route (a cost of  £9,486 per year) due to budgetary constraints.

Route
There are plans to extend the route to Rhynie in future, with a proposed extension from Inverurie to Huntly through Rhynie. The route follows former peat extraction routes.

References

Footpaths in Aberdeenshire